Younan Properties, Inc. is a commercial real estate investment company, headquartered in Los Angeles, California and founded in 2002 by Zaya S. Younan. The company also has regional offices in Dallas, Houston, Colorado, Chicago and Phoenix.

In 2016, Younan Properties expanded into France, forming a French-based holding company, called La Grande Maison Younan Collection, which specializes in the acquisition and operation of luxury properties, products and services.

References

External links

 La Grande Maison Younan Collection Website
 Younan Company Website

Real estate companies of the United States